This is a bibliography of works by and about Daniel Joseph Berrigan, S.J. (May 9, 1921 – April 30, 2016), who was an American Jesuit priest, anti-war activist, poet, essayist, and university instructor. Berrigan was an award-winning and prolific author, who published more than 50 books during his life in 1957, he was awarded the Lamont Prize for his book of poems, Time Without Number.

Chronological listing
Note: Daniel Berrigan was the author, or co-author, of more than fifty books.

Author or coauthor
  – winner of the Lamont Poetry Prize

As a contributor 
 , reprinted as

Miscellaneous

Works about Berrigan
 Francine du Plessix Gray, Divine Disobedience: Profiles in Catholic Radicalism (Knopf, 1970)
 Murray Polner and Jim O'Grady, Disarmed and Dangerous: The Radical Lives and Times of Daniel and Philip Berrigan, Brothers in Religious Faith & Civil Disobedience (Basic Books, 1997 and Westview Press, 1998)
 Daniel Cosacchi and Eric Martin, eds., The Berrigan Letters: Personal Correspondence between Daniel and Philip Berrigan (Orbis Books, 2016)
Joseph Palermo, "Father Daniel Berrigan: The FBI's Most Wanted Peace Activist", in The Human Tradition in America Since 1945, edited by David L. Anderson, (Scholarly Resources, 2003)

References

External links
 Daniel and Philip Berrigan Collection, 1880–1995 at Division of Rare and Manuscript Collections, Cornell University Library
 Daniel Berrigan Papers at Special Collections and Archives, DePaul University
 Daniel Berrigan Papers (finding aid) Special Collections and Archives, DePaul University
 

Bibliographies by writer
Bibliographies of American writers
Poetry bibliographies